Cooch can refer to:

 A colloquial term for the vagina
 A variation of the surname Couch
 William Cooch (1898–1950), New Zealand artist, architect and stamp designer

See also
 Cooch Behar (disambiguation)
 
 Hoochie coochie, a dance
Couch (disambiguation)